Hamilton East—Stoney Creek is a provincial electoral district in Ontario, Canada, that has been represented in the Legislative Assembly of Ontario since the 2007 provincial election.

The riding was formed in 2003 from parts of the former ridings of Hamilton East and Stoney Creek.

Of the 115,709 constituents of the riding, a slight majority were previously constituents in the former riding of Stoney Creek. 58,462 constituents were part of the Stoney Creek riding while 57,247 constituents originated from Hamilton East.

Geography
It consists of the part of the City of Hamilton lying north of the Niagara Escarpment and east of Ottawa Street.

The riding consists of the neighbourhoods of Bartonville, Homeside, Normanhurst, McQuesten, Glenview, Rosedale, Red Hill, Vincent, Gershome, Greenford, Corman, Kentley, Riverdale, Parkview West, Parkview East, Nashdale, Lake Grayside, and the eastern half of The Delta in the former City of Hamilton, as well as the part of the former City of Stoney Creek north of the Niagara Escarpment including the "Old Town", Fruitland and Winona.

Members of Provincial Parliament

Election results

2007 electoral reform referendum

Sources

Elections Ontario Past Election Results
Map of riding for 2018 election

Ontario provincial electoral districts
Politics of Hamilton, Ontario